Antoinette Frissell Bacon (March 10, 1907 – April 17, 1988), known as Toni Frissell, was an American photographer, known for her fashion photography, World War II photographs, and portraits of famous Americans, Europeans, children, and women from all walks of life.

Personal life

Antoinette Frissell was born in 1907 to Lewis Fox Frissell and Antoinette Wood Montgomery. Her brothers were Phelps Montgomery Frissell and filmmaker Varick Frissell, who was killed in Newfoundland during the filming of The Viking in 1931. Frissell was the granddaughter of Algernon Sydney Frissell, founder and president of the Fifth Avenue Bank of New York, and great-granddaughter of Mary Whitney Phelps and Governor of Missouri John S. Phelps. Ancestors include Elisha Phelps, US representative from Connecticut (1819–21, 1825–29), and Maj. Gen. Noah Phelps, Revolutionary War hero.

When Frissell was younger, she was passionate about theater, but after two roles in Max Reinhardt productions, she realized it was not for her. In her early 20s, she started taking pictures in part because of her brother, Varick Frissell, a filmmaker and photographer who taught her the basics of photography. She was married to Francis “Mac” Bacon on September 9, 1932, after a few months of the couple’s romance. She had a passion for skiing, and once went on a three-month long skiing trip with her husband and daughter after her daughter’s graduation. Toni and her husband purchased a large, white house on Long Island at Saint James called 'Sherrewogue' on the water of Stony Brook Harbor where the couple and their family lived for nearly 50 years.

In the early 1970s, she began to have trouble with her memory. To counteract this, she began to write a memoir, one that turned into almost a thousand-page manuscript. Her memoir recounts the times from her childhood to her later life, detailing her privileged upbringing, exploration of Europe, parties in her 20s, youth romances, and adoration for the richer way of life. This early fascination with the privileged life influenced the choice in subjects of her photographs, and the more privileged sports, such as skiing and golf, that she went on to photograph for Sports Illustrated.

Pre-war career

Frissell was born in 1907 in Manhattan, NY, and took photos under the name Toni Frissell, despite her marriage to Manhattan socialite McNeil Bacon. At the beginning of her career, she worked briefly for Vogue, making captions and writing a bit for the magazine. She was fired because of her poor spelling, but was encouraged by Vogue’s fashion editor Carmel Snow to take up photography. She took up photography to cope with the illness of her mother, the death of her brother Varick Frissell, and the end of her engagement to Count Serge Orloff-Davidoff. Her first published picture was in Town and Country. After this, she advocated for herself and got a contract with Vogue. She apprenticed with Cecil Beaton.

She worked with many other famous photographers of the day. Her first photography job, as a fashion photographer for Vogue in 1931, was due to Condé Montrose Nast. She later took photographs for Harper's Bazaar. Her fashion photos, even of evening gowns and such, were often notable for their outdoor settings, emphasizing active women. She was one of the first photographers to move outside of the studio for fashion photography, setting a trend in the field. She did not shoot indoors primarily because “I don't know how to photograph in a studio. I never did know about technical points and still don't”. Her style continued in this ‘plein air’ way throughout her career. For this kind of innovation and experimentation she was well known.

World War II

In 1941, Frissell volunteered her photographic services to the American Red Cross. Later she worked for the Eighth Army Air Force and became the official photographer of the Women's Army Corps. On their behalf, she took thousands of images of nurses, front-line soldiers, WACs, African-American airmen, and orphaned children.

She traveled to the European front twice. Her first picture to be published in Life magazine was of bombed out London in 1942. Her moving photographs of military women and African American fighter pilots in the elite 332d Fighter Group (the "Tuskegee Airmen") were used to encourage public support for women and African Americans in the military.

During the War she produced a series of photographs of children that were used in an edition of Robert Louis Stevenson's much-published A child's garden of verses which were an early example of the successful use of photography in illustration of children's literature.

After the war

In the 1950s, she took informal portraits of the famous and powerful in the United States and Europe, including Winston Churchill, Eleanor Roosevelt, the Vanderbilts, architect Stanford White and John F. and Jacqueline Kennedy, and worked for Sports Illustrated and Life magazines. Throughout her photographic career, she worked at home and abroad for these large publications.

When she grew tired of fashion photography and fluctuating between contracts with Vogue and Harper’s Bazaar, she continued her interest in active women and sports and was hired as the first woman on the staff of Sports Illustrated in 1953, and continued to be one of very few female sport photographers for several decades. After 1950, she did freelance work for Life, Look, Vogue, and Sports until her retirement in 1967.

In later work she concentrated on photographing women from all walks of life, often as a commentary on the human condition. Her iconic 1944 photograph previously used for book illustration, My Shadow, of a boy with outstretched arms admiring his long shadow on the sea sand, was selected by Edward Steichen for the world-touring exhibition The Family of Man at the Museum of Modern Art in New York, that was seen by 9 million visitors. In 1957 the photograph was used for the cover of a popular psychology text. In 1963 an entire feature in Life magazine was devoted to photographs of 'The Loving Embrace' from across her career.

Legacy
In 1966 Life magazine paid tribute to her in a page 3 editorial profile headed 'Patrician Photographer of a Vanishing Age'.

Frissell died of Alzheimer's disease on April 17, 1988, in a Long Island nursing home. Her husband, Francis M. Bacon 3rd, of Bacon, Stevenson & Company, predeceased her. She was survived by her daughter Sidney, and her son Varick.

The collection of her photos in the Library of Congress contains around 340,000 images, and because of its size is not completely available to the public. She and her husband donated her archive of film negatives in 1971.

According to the International Center of Photography Frissell's major contribution to fashion photography was her development of the realistic (as opposed to the staged) fashion photograph in the 1930s and 1940s. Like Martin Munkacsi, she mastered the appearance of unselfconscious spontaneity in fashion pictures by working outside and on location with her models. She had a tendency to use uncommon perspectives, which she achieved by placing her camera on a dramatic diagonal axis, and/or using a low point of view and a wide-angle lens against a neutral background, thus creating the illusion of elongated human form. With her preference for close-ups and straightforward, unembellished images of winsome, sportswear-clad models, Frissell's action-fashion photographs are landmarks in the development of postwar fashion imagery.

Publications

Publications by Frissell
The King Ranch, 1939-1944: A photographic essay. 1965. With an introduction and captions by Holland McCombs.
Toni Frissell: Photographs: 1933-1967. Doubleday, 1994. . With an introduction by George Plimpton and a foreword by Sidney Frissell Stafford.

Publications of others with illustrations by Frissell
A Child's Garden of Verses. 1944.
Bermuda: The Happy Island. 1946.
Mother Goose. 1948.
Tethered. 2008. By Amy MacKinnon.
Bob and Helen Kleberg of King Ranch. 2017. .

References

https://www.icp.org/browse/archive/constituents/toni-frissell?all/all/all/all/0

External links

 The Library of Congress has a large collection of her photographs on pages about her, but apparently no single list of all of them.
 Toni Frissell Collection:Prints and Photographs Division Even more photos are not yet digitized
 Endless Summer (Imagination): American Treasures of the Library of Congress
 Toni Frissell - Women Come to the Front (Library of Congress Exhibition) World War II photographs
 Toni Frissell Collection (Prints and Photographs Reading Room, Library of Congress)

1907 births
1988 deaths
20th-century American photographers
Deaths from dementia in New York (state)
Deaths from Alzheimer's disease
Artists from New York City
People from Manhattan
20th-century American women photographers
American photojournalists
Women photojournalists